Dmitry Borisovich Mertvago (16 August 1760, Mertovshchina village, near the town of Alatyr, Kazan Governorate, Russian Empire – 5 July 1824, Moscow) was a Russian official, senator, Privy Councillor (1817), Tauride Civil Governor (1803–07), Provisions Master General (1807–10), memoirist. Grandfather of Elizaveta Bezobrazova.

Biography
Comes from a noble family. Got a home education. In 1774, along with his family, was captured by Yemelyan Pugachev, and Dmitry's father was hanged in his own village. In 1775 he entered the guard as a non-commissioned officer, joined the service in 1779 as a sergeant. From 1781 in the civil service: prosecutor in Orenburg, from 1786 adviser to the civil chamber in Ufa, from 1787 adviser to Ufa provincial government.

He married one of the daughters of state councilor Mark Poltoratsky. From 1797 he served in the Provisional expedition of the College of War in St. Petersburg, promoted to major general. In early 1802, he retired.

At the end of 1802, under the patronage of Gavrila Derzhavin (then Minister of Justice), he was appointed chief overseer of the Crimean salt lakes. In December 1803 – October 1807, the Taurian civil governor. Since 1807, Provisions Master General, head of the Provision Department of the War Ministry. In this position he repeatedly clashed with the Minister of War Aleksey Arakcheyev. In 1810 he was dismissed from service, lived in his estate in the Tver province.

In 1817, he was appointed senator to Moscow; in 1818, under the personal order of Emperor Alexander I, he headed a senatorial audit investigating abuses committed by the administrations of Vladimir, Astrakhan and Caucasus provinces. In the last years of his life, he maintained close relations with the Archbishop of Moscow and Kolomna Philaret Drozdov.

Memoirs
From 1807, at the insistence of Derzhavin, Mertvago began working on the "Notes" in which he described the events of the Pugachev's Rebellion, the reign of Emperor Paul I, and he gave portraits of prominent statesmen of the late 18th – early 19th centuries.

Bibliography

References

Sources

External links
Creative Nineteenth Century: Issues of the History of Taurida Governorate

1760 births
1824 deaths
Senators of the Russian Empire
Memoirists from the Russian Empire
Governors of the Taurida Governorate